Mixed Nuts is a 1922 American black-and-white silent film starring Stan Laurel. The film is a two-reeler (600m.) comedy short. The film was created by re-cutting an earlier film, Nuts in May (1917), adding footage and outtakes from another movie, The Pest (1922), and filming new (primarily bridging) sequences, in order to combine the diverse contributing elements into a complete, coherent narrative.

Cast
 Stan Laurel as Book salesman
 Max Asher as Doctor
 Dave Morris as Drunk

See also
 List of American films of 1922

External links

Mixed Nuts at SilentEra

1922 films
1922 short films
Silent American comedy films
American silent short films
American black-and-white films
1922 comedy films
Films directed by James Parrott
Films produced by Samuel Bischoff
American comedy short films
1920s American films